French football club SEC Bastia's 1967–68 season. Finished 1st place in league and promoted to Division 1. Top scorer of the season, including 13 goals in 13 league matches have been Robert Blanc. Was eliminated to Coupe de France end of 64.

Transfers

In 
 Robert Blanc from Boulogne
 Henri Borowski from Toulon
 Roland Ehrhardt from Marseille
 Franck Fiawoo from Marseille
 Claude Papi from AS Porto-Vecchio

Out 
 Alain Cornu to Toulon
 Etienne Sansonetti to Ajaccio
 Sadek Boukhalfa to Metz
 Robert Traba to Béziers
 Georges Franceschetti to Cannes
 Jean-Louis Lagadec to free

Squad

Division 2

League table

Matches 
 19 August 1967; Dunkerque 0-1 Bastia, 3,300 att..
 Blanc 

 27 August 1967; Bastia 2-1 Grenoble, 1,700 att..
 Blanc 

 2 September 1967; Toulon 2-1 Bastia, 5,600 att..
 Zenier 

 6 September 1967; Bastia 2-0 Montpellier, 1,900 att..
 Blanc 

 10 September 1967; Bastia 0-0 Reims, 1,900 att..
 - - - - - - - - -

 24 September 1967; Avignon 4-0 Bastia, 3,750 att..
 - - - - - - - - -

 1 October 1967; Bastia 2-0 Besançon, 2,500 att..
 Blanc , Zenier 

 6 October 1967; Nancy 1-0 Bastia, 7,300 att..
 - - - - - - - - -

 11 October 1967; Battalion Joinville 0-1 Bastia, 3,700 att..
 Papi 

 14 October 1967; Chaumont 0-0 Bastia, 3,650 att..
 - - - - - - - - -

 22 October 1967; Bastia 3-0 Boulogne, 2,300 att..
 Ferrier , Ehrhardt 

 29 October 1967; Limoges 1-2 Bastia, 2,300 att..
 Papi , Camadini 

 1 November 1967; Bastia 1-0 Nîmes, 2,600 att..
 Blanc 

 12 November 1967; Bastia 3-0 Angoulême, 3,100 att..
 Panisi , Ferrier , Blanc 

 19 November 1967; Lorient 0-0 Bastia, 12,400 att..
 - - - - - - - - - -

 26 November 1967; Bastia 2-0 Béziers, 2,300 att..
 Zenier , Papi 

 10 December 1967; Bastia 2-0 Cannes, 1,900 att..
 Panisi , Blanc 

 7 January 1968; Bastia 2-1 Toulon, 1,400 att..
 Blanc , Camadini 

 21 January 1968; Montpellier 1-0 Bastia, 2,550 att..
 - - - - - - - - - -

 4 February 1968; Bastia 7-2 Avignon, 2,300 att..
 Vescovali , Ehrhardt , Fiawoo , Ferrier 

 18 February 1968; Besançon 1-1 Bastia, 1,600 att..
 Fiawoo 

 25 February 1968; Bastia 2-0 Nancy, 3,200 att..
 Fiawoo , Ehrhardt 

 3 March 1968; Bastia 3-1 Battalion Joinville, 2,800 att..
 Blanc , Ehrhardt , Ferrier 

 23 March 1968; Reims 1-1 Bastia, 12,700 att..
 Blanc 

 6 April 1968; Bastia 1-0 Limoges, 2,200 att.
 Fiawoo 

 14 April 1968; Nîmes 0-0 Bastia, 12,400 att..
 - - - - - - - - - - -

 21 April 1968; Béziers 0-1 Bastia, 2,700 att..
 Fiawoo 

 27 April 1968; Bastia 3-1 Chaumont, 2,250 att..
 Zenier , Fiawoo 

 5 May 1968; Angoulême 2-1 Bastia, 4,200 att..
 Fiawoo 

 19 May 1968; Bastia 2-0 Lorient, 2,600 att..
 Blanc , Zenier 

 16 June 1968; Boulogne 2-2 Bastia, 1,000 att..
 Fiawoo , Vescovali 

 25 June 1968; Cannes 0-1 Bastia, 1,800 att..
 Papi 

 30 June 1968; Bastia 3-0 Dunkerque, 2,600 att..
 Zenier , Fiawoo 

 7 July 1968; Grenoble 1-1 Bastia, 3,900 att..
 Papi

Coupe de France 

End of 64
 14 January 1968; Sochaux 5-1 Bastia, 1,500 att..
 Camadini

External links 
 All matches of 1967-68 and All information of 1967-68 - Corse Football 

SC Bastia seasons
Bastia